"The Axeman Cometh" is the sixth episode of the third season of the anthology television series American Horror Story, which premiered on November 13, 2013, on the cable network FX. This episode is rated TV-MA (LSV).

This episode focuses on the girls awakening the spirit of a long-dead serial killer, The Axeman (Danny Huston). Danny Huston guest stars as the Axeman. Angela Bassett and Gabourey Sidibe guest star as Marie Laveau and Queenie, respectively.

Plot

1919
The Axeman of New Orleans writes out a letter. The witches of Miss Robichaux's Academy debate whether to play jazz music, which the manifesto claims will spare them from murder. Later, bold witch Millie leads the Axeman to the Coven, where he proceeds to kill her but she uses teleportation and stabs him. The other witches emerge from each corner of the room and stab him to death.

2013
Zoe rummages through Madison's items, and a bottle rolls to a hidden compartment in the closet. Inside Zoe finds a ouija board, and her, Queenie and Nan use it to contact Madison. Instead, they contact the Axeman, who blames them for his murder. Queenie stops the planchette afterwards. Zoe wants to revive his contact to get answers on Madison, but Queenie and Nan refuse. Zoe continues alone, and the Axeman directs her to the attic. She investigates and finds Madison. Zoe is discovered by Spalding, but she knocks him unconscious. The girls interrogate and torture Spalding about Madison's murder. He challenges them to contact the authorities and expose the Coven. Queenie uses her voodoo powers on Spalding and he falls unconscious again. Zoe does not believe Spalding killed Madison.

Fiona prepares Cordelia's room as her daughter enters with Hank. Cordelia brushes against Hank and it leads to another vision of Hank's infidelity. She threatens he will be held accountable for his betrayals and furiously throws him out of the house. A touch from Fiona shows a vision of Myrtle's execution. Cordelia is aghast and refuses to believe Myrtle blinded her. Misty waters her garden in the swamp, including Myrtle's body. Kyle arrives, and she bathes him. Reliving his mother's abuse, he thrashes around, violently wrecking Misty's possessions. Zoe arrives and says she is taking them both out of there. In Cordelia's greenhouse, Misty agrees to bring Madison back to life. Hank shows up at Marie's salon and it is revealed that Hank is a witch hunter. It is also revealed that Marie hired Hank 6 years before, to kill every Salem Descendent. Furious, Marie demands Hank to bring her the heads of all the witches and to burn the school down, or she will kill him.

Misty detects bad vibes and leaves the Academy, while Madison slowly recovers from her death. The Axeman's spirit attacks Cordelia, and Zoe uses her power of Divination. This gives the Axeman enough substance to re-form and walk out of the Academy. He finds Fiona in a bar and offers to buy her a drink.

Reception
Rotten Tomatoes reports an 87% approval rating, based on 15 reviews. The critical consensus reads, ""The Axeman Cometh" drops the exciting new Axeman character and his interesting mythology into the mix, taking the focus away from the main storyline with insanely fun results." Emily VanDerWerff of The A.V. Club gave the episode a C rating, and wrote, "I realized that I don't give a good goddamn about anything that happens to anybody this season." Matt Fowler of IGN wrote, "[The episode], much like the first half of the Halloween two-parter, was incomplete. Hank's been ordered by Laveau to kill everyone at Robichaux's, Spalding's been caught red-handed as a necropheliac (nice Rocky Horror Riff Raff reference there too!), and the Axeman has his sights set on Fiona. All threads to be picked up next week. A diversionary episode, but a fun one too."

"The Axeman Cometh" received a 2.3 18–49 ratings share, up from the previous episode, and was watched by 4.16 million viewers in its original American broadcast.

References

External links

 
 "The Axeman Cometh" at TV Guide.com

2013 American television episodes
American Horror Story: Coven episodes
Fiction set in 1919
Television episodes directed by Michael Uppendahl